Vattal Kurisu Palli in Maikavu is oldest chapel . The patron saints of this parish are Saint George and Parumala Thirumeni. Situated by the side of coconut palms and a wide stretch of arecanut fields, at a village called Maikavu which is about 40 km from Kozhikode, this church is the refuge of thousands of people worldwide who seek the intercession of St. George. The Mother Church of this chapel is St.Mary's Jacobite Syrian Church, Maikavu.

External links

Churches in Kozhikode district
Syriac Orthodox churches in India
Churches in Maikave